Zephaniah Ngodzo (born 25 January 1985) is a Zimbabwean football defender who currently plays for Bulawayo City F.C.

References

1985 births
Living people
Zimbabwean footballers
Zimbabwe international footballers
Highlanders F.C. players
F.C. Platinum players
Chicken Inn F.C. players
Bantu Tshintsha Guluva Rovers F.C. players
Bulawayo City F.C. players
Association football defenders